Nana Peth is an area located in Pune City, in Maharashtra State of the Republic of India. The name is derived from the name of Nana Phadanvis. This area is famous for hospitals, temples, and dargah located in the center of the street and for the various automobile spare parts, battery, and tyre shops.

References

Peths in Pune